Proyeccion a Nuevas Promesas (2010), short for Torneo Relampago de Proyeccion a Nuevas Promesas de la Lucha Libre (Spanish for "Projecting a new promise lightning tournament") was the first annual Proyeccion a Nuevas Promesas professional wrestling event produced by the International Wrestling Revolution Group. It took place on January 1, 2010, at Arena Naucalpan in Naucalpan, State of Mexico. The focal point of the show was the Torneo Relampago de Proyeccion a Nuevas Promesas de la Lucha Libre tag team tournament where eight teams competed for the trophy. In 2012 the tournament was renamed El Protector but the tournament concept remained the same. This event was also the 14th IWRG Anniversary Show.

Production

Background
Lucha Libre has a tradition for a tournament where a rookie, or novato, would be teamed up with an experienced veteran wrestler for a tag team tournament in the hopes of giving the Novato a chance to show case their talent and move up the ranks. Consejo Mundial de Lucha Libre has held a Torneo Gran Alternativa ("Great Alternative Tournament") almost every year since 1994, but the concept predates the creation of the Gran Alternativa. The Mexican professional wrestling company International Wrestling Revolution Group (IWRG; at times referred to as Grupo Internacional Revolución in Mexico) started their own annual rookie/veteran tournament in 2010. The first two tournaments were called Torneo Relampago de Proyeccion a Nuevas Promesas de la Lucha Libre (Spanish for "Projecting a new promise lightning tournament") but would be renamed the El Protector tournament in 2012. The Proyeccion a Nuevas Promesas shows, as well as the majority of the IWRG shows in general, are held in "Arena Naucalpan", owned by the promoters of IWRG and their main arena. The 2010 Proyeccion a Nuevas Promesas show was the first time that IWRG promoted a show around the rookie/veteran tournament, with the name changing to El Protector in 2012 and onwards.

Storylines
The event featured nine professional wrestling matches with different wrestlers involved in pre-existing scripted feuds, plots and storylines. Wrestlers were portrayed as either heels (referred to as rudos in Mexico, those that portray the "bad guys") or faces (técnicos in Mexico, the "good guy" characters) as they followed a series of tension-building events, which culminated in a wrestling match or series of matches.

Tournament participants
Tetsuya Bushi  and Guerrero 2000 
Comando Negro  and Oficial 911 
Dinamic Black  and Chico Che 
Alan Extreme  and Black Terry 
Guizmo  and Ultraman, Jr. 
Hijo del Signo  and Dr. Cerebro 
Imperial  and Rocket 
Keshin Black  and Veneno

Results

References

External links 
 

2010 in professional wrestling
2010 in Mexico
2010
January 2010 events in Mexico
14